
Ellenberg may refer to:

Places

Germany 
Ellenberg, Baden-Württemberg 
Ellenberg, Rhineland-Palatinate
Ellenberg, Saxony-Anhalt, in Altmarkkreis Salzwedel district

Elsewhere 
Ellenburg, New York, a town

People 
Heinz Ellenberg (1913–1997), botanist and ecologist
Jordan Ellenberg (born 1971), mathematician
Susan S. Ellenberg, biostatistician